Robert Gojani (born 19 October 1992) is a Swedish professional footballer who plays as a midfielder for Kalmar FF in the Allsvenskan.

Club career
On 31 August 2021, Gojani signed a deal until June 2024 with Silkeborg IF in the Danish Superliga. On 5 February 2023, Gojani returned to Sweden, signing a 3-year deal with Kalmar FF.

International career
Gojani made his debut for Sweden national team on 7 January 2018 in a friendly against Estonia. The game was not officially recognized by FIFA.

Personal life
He is of Kosovo Albanian descent.

References

External links

 

1992 births
Living people
Swedish footballers
Swedish expatriate footballers
Sweden international footballers
Association football midfielders
Swedish people of Kosovan descent
Swedish people of Albanian descent
IFK Öxnehaga players
Jönköpings Södra IF players
IF Elfsborg players
Silkeborg IF players
Kalmar FF players
Allsvenskan players
Superettan players
Danish Superliga players
Swedish expatriate sportspeople in Denmark
Expatriate men's footballers in Denmark